Hello, What's Your Name? is a remix album by British rock group The Kooks, released on 4 December 2015. It contains songs from the band's fourth album, Listen, as remixed by the likes of French electronic music duo Montmartre, Florence and the Machine keyboardist Isabella Summers, and Belgian techno DJ Frank De Wulf, among others.

The album also contains the Jack Beats remix of "Creatures of Habit", a new track co-written with keyboardist Isom Innis of tour mates Foster the People. "We were hanging out at his place and this just happened," said lead singer Luke Pritchard of the track. "We took some pretty huge synths and a very miniature piano and worked. It's a reflection of my times in L.A. and living a bit of the American Dream and the American nightmare syndrome. Being far away from home but also feeling at home." The original version of the track was released digitally on 13 October 2015, and the remix afterwards, to positive reviews, with The Indiependent calling it the "kind of experimentation that keeps their music interesting,", and Goldmine referring to it as "one of the most infectious grooves they've produced."

The album was announced on 22 October 2015 via the band's Facebook page, with a Kove remix of "Are We Electric" being premiered on ClashMusic.com. Several other tracks were debuted on various music websites leading up to the album's release, including Isabella Summers' remix of "Forgive & Forget", Frank De Wulf's remix of "Westside", Montmartre's remix of "Sweet Emotion" and DJ Pierre's remix of "Dreams".

Track listing

References 

2015 remix albums